Polycoccum anatolicum is a species of lichenicolous fungus in the family Polycoccaceae. It was described as a new species by Mehmet Gökhan Halici and Hatice Esra Akgül in 2013. The specific epithet refers to the type locality in Anatolia.

The fungus causes mild bleaching on infected parts of the surface of the host. It is the only species of Polycoccum known to infect Lepraria. Polycoccum dzieduszyckii is morphologically similar, but can be distinguished from P. anatolicum by its eight-spored asci and its growth on Verrucaria.

References

Trypetheliales
Taxa described in 2013
Fungi of Asia
Lichenicolous fungi